The Degg's Model shows that a natural disaster only occurs if a vulnerable population is exposed to a hazard.  It was devised in 1992 by Dr. Martin Degg, Head of Geography at the University of Chester.It also depends on how far people are from the epicentre of an earthquake, volcano or any other natural tectonic disaster.

References 

Hazard analysis